Abbas Papizadeh is an Iranian politician who represented Dezful in the Islamic Consultative Assembly in the 9th and 10th term, since 2012.

References

People from Dezful
Deputies of Dezful
Living people
Members of the 9th Islamic Consultative Assembly
Members of the 10th Islamic Consultative Assembly
Lorestan University alumni
Year of birth missing (living people)